The Gifford Grange Hall is a historic Grange hall located in Guilderland, Albany County, New York.  It was built about 1866 as a general store and post office.  It is a plain, two story frame commercial building with a one-story porch across the front with a shed roof.

It was listed on the National Register of Historic Places in 1982.

See also
 National Register of Historic Places listings in Albany County, New York

References

Grange buildings on the National Register of Historic Places in New York (state)
Cultural infrastructure completed in 1866
Buildings and structures in Albany County, New York
Grange organizations and buildings in New York (state)
1866 establishments in New York (state)
National Register of Historic Places in Albany County, New York